Weathered is the debut extended play (EP) by American singer-songwriter Angie Miller. It was released independently on November 12, 2014. Weathered serves as her first release after placing in the Top 3 on the twelfth season of American Idol.

Development

In August 2014, Miller announced via her official website that she would release her debut EP in November. A month later, the EP's title was confirmed to be Weathered, with a release date set for November 12 and its artwork was also revealed.

Promotion
A PledgeMusic campaign was launched in August 2014 in order to promote the album.

Critical reception
AllMusic's Mark Deming gave the album three out of five stars, highlighting Miller's mature "emotional perspective".

Track listing

Release history

References

2014 debut EPs
Pop rock EPs